is a multi-purpose stadium in Ukyo-ku, Kyoto, Japan. It was formerly known as Kyoto Nishikyogoku Athletic Stadium. Since August 2019 it has been called Takebishi Stadium Kyoto until July 2029 for the naming rights by Takebishi (たけびし).

It was used mostly for football matches and was the home stadium of J.League club Kyoto Sanga FC until 2019.

The stadium holds 20,588 people and was built in 1942. It hosted the football match between Romania and Ghana during the 1964 Summer Olympics.

In 2019, Kyoto Sanga announced plans to move to Sanga Stadium by Kyocera, a new, football-specific stadium being built in Kameoka, in time for the 2020 season to start.

Access 

3-minute walk from Nishi-Kyōgoku Station on the Hankyū Kyoto Main Line.

Events 
 Kyoto Marathon
 All-Japan High School Ekiden Championship
 Inter-Prefectural Women's Ekiden

References

FIFA.com 1964 Summer Olympics ROU-GHA results. – accessed 14 August 2010.  
 Facilities Guide, Kyoto City Office  
 Stadium Information, Kyoto City Amateur Sports Association 

Venues of the 1964 Summer Olympics
Olympic football venues
Football venues in Japan
Rugby union stadiums in Japan
Athletics (track and field) venues in Japan
American football venues in Japan
Buildings and structures in Kyoto
Multi-purpose stadiums in Japan
Sports venues in Kyoto Prefecture
American football in Japan
Kyoto Sanga FC
1942 establishments in Japan
Sports venues completed in 1942
College football venues